Yenyukovo is a rural locality (a village) in Yargomzhskoye Rural Settlement, Cherepovetsky District, Vologda Oblast, Russia. The population was 138 as of 2002.

Geography 
Yenyukovo is located 26 km north of Cherepovets (the district's administrative centre) by road. Ramenye is the nearest rural locality.

References 

Rural localities in Cherepovetsky District